Volodymyr Vasylyovych Matsyhura (born 14 May 1975) is a former Ukrainian professional footballer.

Club career
He made his professional debut in the Ukrainian Second League in 1993 for FC Boryspil. He played 4 games and scored 1 goal in the 1999 UEFA Intertoto Cup for FC Rostselmash Rostov-on-Don.

References

1975 births
Sportspeople from Kyiv
Living people
Ukrainian footballers
Ukrainian expatriate footballers
Russian Premier League players
Süper Lig players
FC Rostov players
Kocaelispor footballers
FC Metalist Kharkiv players
FC Volgar Astrakhan players
FC Taraz players
Expatriate footballers in Turkey
Expatriate footballers in Russia
Expatriate footballers in Kazakhstan
Ukrainian expatriate sportspeople in Turkey
Ukrainian expatriate sportspeople in Russia
Ukrainian expatriate sportspeople in Kazakhstan
Association football midfielders
Association football defenders